Note:
Merriam-Webster defines war as "a state of opened and declared armed hostile conflict between states or nations". Lexico defines war as "A state of armed conflict between different countries or different groups within a country". Conflicts causing at least 1,000 deaths in one calendar year are considered wars by the Uppsala Conflict Data Program. For other conflicts, see rebellions, coups and separate battles.
This is a list of wars that began from 2003 onwards. Other wars can be found in the historical lists of wars and the list of wars extended by diplomatic irregularity.

2003–2009

2010–2019

2020–2023

See also

References

External links
Heidelberg Institute for International Conflict Research (HIIK)
 Conflict Barometer - Describes recent trends in conflict development, escalations, and settlements

Lists of armed conflicts in the 21st century
2003-present
21st-century military history